All the Fault of Paradise (Italian: Tutta colpa del paradiso) is a 1985 Italian romance-comedy film directed by Francesco Nuti.

For his performance Nuti won the Ciak d'oro for best actor.

Cast 
Francesco Nuti: Romeo Casamonica
Ornella Muti: Celeste
Roberto Alpi: Alessandro
: Lorenzo
Laura Betti: Director
: Sonny
Novello Novelli: Hotel keeper
: Wanda
: Mario
Patrizia Tesone: Guardian

See also  
 List of Italian films of 1985

References

External links

1985 films
Italian romantic comedy films
1985 romantic comedy films
Films directed by Francesco Nuti
Films with screenplays by Vincenzo Cerami
1980s Italian films